is a Prefectural Natural Park in western Saga Prefecture, Japan. First designated for protection in 1937, the park spans the municipalities of Arita, Imari, and Takeo.

See also
 National Parks of Japan

References

Parks and gardens in Saga Prefecture
Protected areas established in 1937
1937 establishments in Japan